Goniotorna synastra is a species of moth of the family Tortricidae. It is found in Madagascar and on Grande Comore in the Comoros.

Subspecies
Goniotorna synastra synastra (Madagascar)
Goniotorna synastra occulta Karisch, 2008 (Grande Comoro)

References

Moths described in 1918
Goniotorna